Dalia Grybauskaitė (born 1 March 1956) is a Lithuanian politician who served as the eighth President of Lithuania from 2009 until 2019. She is the first woman to hold the position and in 2014 she became the first President of Lithuania to be reelected for a second consecutive term.

Grybauskaitė has served as Minister of Finance, as well as European Commissioner for Financial Programming and the Budget from 2004 to 2009. She is often referred to as the "Iron Lady" or the "Steel Magnolia".

Early years
Grybauskaitė was born on 1 March 1956 to a working-class family in Vilnius during the Soviet occupation of Lithuania. Her mother, Vitalija Korsakaitė (1922–1989), was born in the Biržai region and worked as a saleswoman. Her father, Polikarpas Grybauskas (1928–2008), was an electrician and driver. He also was a NKVD serviceman during the Second World War. Grybauskaitė attended Salomėja Nėris High School. She has two brothers, one living in Lithuania, and the other living in Colorado Springs, in the United States. She has described herself as not among the best students, receiving mostly fours in a system where five was the highest grade. Her favourite subjects were history, geography and physics.

Grybauskaitė began participating in sports at the age of eleven, and became a passionate basketball player. At the age of nineteen, she worked for a year at the Lithuanian National Philharmonic Society as a staff inspector. She then enrolled in A.A. Zhdanov State University in Leningrad, as a student of political economy. At the same time, she began working in a local factory in Leningrad. In 1983, Grybauskaitė graduated with a citation and returned to Vilnius, taking a secretarial position at the Academy of Sciences. Work in the Academy was scarce and so she moved to the Vilnius Communist Party High School, where she lectured in political economics and global finance. From 1983 to December 1989, she was a member of the Communist Party of the Soviet Union and after the Communist Party of Lithuania broke away from the CPSU in December 1989, she was member of the CPL until June 1990. In 1988, she defended her PhD thesis at Moscow (Academy of Social Sciences).

In 1990, soon after Lithuania reestablished its independence from the Soviet Union, Grybauskaitė continued her studies at the Edmund A. Walsh School of Foreign Service at Georgetown University, Washington D.C., in the Special Programme for senior executives.

Early career
Between 1991 and 1993, Grybauskaitė worked as Director of the European Department at the Ministry of International Economic Relations of the Republic of Lithuania. During 1993, she was employed in the Foreign Ministry as director of the Economic Relations Department, and represented Lithuania when it entered the European Union free trade agreements. She also chaired the Aid Coordination Committee (Phare and the G24). Soon afterwards, she was named Extraordinary Envoy and Plenipotentiary Minister at the Lithuanian Mission to the EU. There, she worked as the deputy chief negotiator for the EU Europe Agreement and as a representative of the National Aid Co-ordination in Brussels.

In 1996, Grybauskaitė was appointed Plenipotentiary Minister in the United States' Lithuanian embassy. She held this position until 1999, when she was appointed deputy Minister of Finance. As part of this role, she led Lithuanian negotiations with the World Bank and International Monetary Fund. In 2000, Grybauskaitė became Vice Minister of Foreign Affairs, going on in 2001 to become Minister of Finance in the Algirdas Brazauskas government. Lithuania joined the European Union on 1 May 2004, and Grybauskaitė was named a European Commissioner on the same day.

European Commission
Grybauskaitė initially served as European Commissioner for Education, Culture, Multilingualism and Youth. She held this position until 11 November 2004, when she was named European Commissioner for Financial Programming and the Budget within the José Manuel Barroso-led Commission.

In November 2005, Grybauskaitė was named "Commissioner of the Year" in the European Voice Europeans of the Year poll. She was nominated "for her unrelenting efforts to shift EU spending towards areas that would enhance competitiveness such as research and development." She commented:

As Financial and Budget Commissioner, she strongly criticized the EU budget, stating it was "not a budget for the 21st century." The majority of the EU budget was spent on agricultural programmes. Grybauskaitė presented a 2008 EU budget in which, for the first time in its history, spending on growth and employment constituted the highest share of the budget, exceeding that of agriculture and natural resources. She frequently criticised the Lithuanian Government, headed by Prime Minister Gediminas Kirkilas, for its lack of response to the approaching financial crisis.

2009 presidential election
On 26 February 2009, Grybauskaitė officially announced her candidacy for the 2009 presidential election. In her declaration speech, she said:

There were three women and four men as presidential candidates. Opinion polls taken in February 2009 showed that Grybauskaitė was the undisputed leader in the race. She ran as an independent, although she was supported by the dominant Christian Democrats as well as by NGOs, including Sąjūdis.

Her campaign was primarily focused on domestic issues. After years of strong economic growth, Lithuania faced a deep recession, with double-digit declines in economic indicators. The unemployment rate rose to 15.5% in March 2009, and a January street protest against the government's response to the recession turned violent. During the campaign, Grybauskaitė stressed the need to combat the financial troubles by protecting those with the lowest incomes, simplifying the Lithuanian bureaucratic apparatus, and reviewing the government's investment programme. She also promised a more balanced approach in conducting foreign policy, the primary constitutional role of the Lithuanian presidency.

The election was held on 17 May 2009. Grybauskaitė won in a landslide, receiving 69.1% of the valid vote. The 51.6% turnout was just above the threshold needed to avoid a runoff election. In winning the election, Grybauskaitė became not only the first female president of Lithuania, but won by the largest margin recorded for a free election in Lithuania.

Political analysts attributed the easy victory to Grybauskaitė's financial competence and her ability to avoid domestic scandals. The international press was quick to dub her the "Lithuanian Iron Lady" for her outspoken speech and her black belt in karate. Grybauskaitė, who speaks Lithuanian, English, Russian, French and Polish, has mentioned Margaret Thatcher and Mahatma Gandhi as her political role models.

Presidency (2009–2019)

Grybauskaitė assumed presidential duties on 12 July 2009, and accepted half of her presidential salary (312,000 litas). Her first presidential visits abroad were made to Sweden and Latvia; in April 2011, she made a state visit to Norway. Grybauskaitė supported the NATO-led military intervention in Libya.

In 2014, Grybauskaitė was reelected President. She received 46% of the vote in the first round, and defeated Zigmantas Balčytis of the Social Democratic Party in the run-off with 58% of the vote.

Domestic policy

Style of leadership

According to Tapio Raunio and Thomas Sedelios, the office of President during Grybauskaitė's two terms was the strongest in Lithuanian history since 1990. Grybauskaitė took advantage of grey areas in the Constitution of Lithuania to accrue additional competences, such as a monopoly on Lithuania's representation in the European Council, and often made use of informal power, such as personal meetings between the Presidential office, Prime Ministers and individual ministers, to express positions on matters outside of the Presidency's competences. 

During the campaign for the 2014 Lithuanian presidential election, Grybauskaitė was accused of "autocracy" and collusion with the Homeland Union. However, Grybauskaitė publicly stated that she does not support granting additional powers to the Presidency, instead stating that the existing Presidential powers should be "used more effectively".

Grybauskaitė is generally seen as a President friendly to the Homeland Union, and polls most strongly with conservative and liberal voters.

Conflict with the Seimas in 2012

After the 2012 Lithuanian parliamentary election, Grybauskaitė declared that she will not accept any proposed cabinet which includes the Labour Party, which earned the second largest number of seats in the Seimas in the election. Labour, a populist political party led by Russian-born businessman and oligarch Viktor Uspaskich, was implicated in the so-called "dark accounting" case in 2006 and was also seen by the President as a pro-Russian party. However, Grybauskaitė was unable to prevent the formation of a coalition between Labour and the Social Democrats, which took office as the Butkevičius Cabinet.

Grybauskaitė remained influential during the rest of the term and vetted Labour-proposed minister candidates with various means, including testing ministerial candidates on their knowledge of English. After the Electoral Action of Poles in Lithuania left the coalition in 2014 and their minister Jarosław Niewierowicz resigned, the position of Minister of Energy officially fell to Labour, but Niewierowicz's replacement, Rokas Masiulis, was widely seen as Grybauskaitė's candidate.

Foreign policy

Relations with Russia

At the beginning of her first term, Grybauskaitė tried to reset relations with Russia and check whether pragmatic relations with Russia were possible. In 2010, Grybauskaitė even met with Russian Prime Minister Vladimir Putin in Helsinki. However, after this meeting, relations between Lithuania and Russia began to cool down.

On 19 December 2013, Grybauskaitė decided to boycott the Sochi Winter Olympics together with other Western leaders, including German president Joachim Gauck, French president François Hollande, and the US president Barack Obama, due to Russia's human rights violations, attitudes and behaviour with Eastern partners and Lithuania. Relations with Russia markedly deteriorated during Grybauskaitė's second term in office, due in part to her hard line stance against Russian influence in Europe and the Baltics, especially after the start of the Russo-Ukrainian War. 

In May 2014, Grybauskaitė called the dependence on Russian gas an "existential threat" to Lithuania.

Following her reelection in May 2014, she said "Dignity, self-respect and mutual benefit, these are the principles that should set the basis for relations between countries and no doubt, knowing that this is our neighbor, we wish this country to democratize and cope with the arising economic challenges".

In June 2014, Grybauskaitė told the German news magazine Focus: "[Putin] uses nationality as a pretext to conquer territory with military means. That's exactly what Stalin and Hitler did." She also claimed that Russia and Putin were "characterised by aggressiveness, violence, and a willingness to overstep boundaries."

On 20 November 2014, Grybauskaitė, commenting on the conflict in Ukraine, characterized Russia as "a terrorist state which carries out an open aggression against its neighbors".

In June 2018, Grybauskaitė said that Lithuania should be ready for Russian invasion. She also said that Western states will "wake up" only "when they have been attacked" by Russia.

In December 2018, Grybauskaitė told Ukrainian President Petro Poroshenko that Lithuania would increase military assistance to Ukraine: "We will additionally supply more ammunition, send more military instructors and cyber security experts to help repel hybrid attacks, especially during the elections."

Relations with the EU and United States
In December 2014, Grybauskaitė said that Lithuania will have to take the responsibility for the secret CIA-operated prison in Lithuania.

Regarding British Prime Minister Theresa May's comments on acting as a "bridge" between the European Union and the United States, Grybauskaitė said that "I don't think there is a necessity for a bridge. We communicate with the Americans on Twitter." In March 2017, Grybauskaitė criticized the government of Poland and Prime Minister Beata Szydło for not endorsing Donald Tusk again for the President of the European Council.

Brexit 
In January 2019, Grybauskaitė said a "no-deal Brexit" would be better than delaying Brexit. She said the EU would negotiate mini or sectoral arrangements to mitigate a no-deal scenario.

Post-presidency (2019–present)
In March 2020, Grybauskaitė was appointed by the President of the United Nations General Assembly and the President of the United Nations Economic and Social Council as one of the two co-chairs of the High Level Panel on International Financial Accountability Transparency and Integrity for Achieving the 2030 Agenda (FACTI Panel).

Personal life
In addition to her native Lithuanian, she is fluent in English, Russian and Polish, and also speaks French. Grybauskaitė has a black belt in karate.

Controversies

Relationship with the foreign press 
In 2015, Grybauskaitė received some backlash in Latvia as well as Lithuania after an interview for Latvian Television. The conversation took a different turn after journalist Gundars Rēders asked about the possibility of legalisation of same-sex marriages in Lithuania. The President of Lithuania responded by saying that there are no discussions regarding this question and added: “I think we did not agree on these questions. We agreed on [a specific set of] questions and you don't try to drag me on for 40 minutes. If you’re finished with your questions, we’re finished.” Soon after, Grybauskaitė demanded that the latter segment of the interview would be cut out. Rēders continued by asking about the President's thoughts on the tragedy of Maxima, which took place in Riga in 2013, and about her top 5 favourite basketball players but such questions were also turned down. “You cannot ask non-agreed questions for the President. I don't give such kind of interviews,” Grybauskaitė added once the interview had come to an end.

Latvians, especially the journalist community, expressed their dismay on social media towards the seemingly authoritarian behaviour of the Lithuanian President. Famous Latvian journalist Inga Spriņģe reacted to the infamous interview on Twitter, by saying: “Hmm, if Grybauskaitė demanded so fiercely to cut out the questions that were not agreed upon beforehand, I have a feeling that for Lithuanian journalists it is the norm.”

Another minor incident that received attention in Lithuania happened in November 2017, during a Social Summit for Fair Jobs and Growth in Gothenburg, Sweden where a local reporter for Göteborgs-Posten asked Grybauskaitė whether she's aware of the discrimination of Lithuanian employees in Sweden as well as the fact that they are getting underpaid. The President expressed her unawareness and stated that “[i]t’s not a very good message to me. I will clarify if it’s true.” The response was followed by the President's attempt to laugh off the situation, which was something Lithuanians back home perceived as completely inappropriate while local political commentators believed that Grybauskaitė’s way of handling the unexpected question was not suitable either.

KGB accusations 
The public had questioned Grybauskaitė’s possible relations to the KGB in the past numerous times. Dalia Grybauskaitė herself had repeatedly denied having any ties with the Soviet intelligence services. Lithuanian investigative journalist Rūta Janutienė made an episode on Grybauskaitė showcasing various documents about her possible ties with the KGB but this episode never officially aired on TV3. In 2015, politician Zigmas Vaišvila had appealed to the Ministry of Internal Affairs of Russia as well as the Embassy of Russia in Lithuania for them to disclose the information about whether or not Grybauskaitė worked for the USSR Embassy in the US in 1991. Russian institutions had refused to provide any insight on the matter stating: “According to the Article 7 on Personal Data of the Federal Law, operators and inner employees who have access to personal data are obligated not to disclose any information to a third party or share any personal information without the consent of the subject to whom it belongs.” To quote Vaišvila, “in legal terms, this is confirmation that Ms Dalia Grybauskaitė is a subject defended by the Russian state—this goes for her personal data as well as for the secrets of Russia.” Nonetheless, The Insider claimed that the allegations about Grybauskaitė being an ex-KGB agent are false and that in 2015 the Center for Research of Genocide and Resistance of Lithuanian residents was hacked and fake documents about Grybauskaitė as the agent “Magnolia” were published. The claim was backed up by stating that one of the letters allegedly written in 1982 contains inaccuracies and suspicious formulations.

The question was raised again during the talk show Hang On There with Andrius Tapinas when the creator of the documentary The Secret of the State about Grybauskaitė, Donatas Ulvydas, had confirmed to the host that she went to a KGB school. According to Ulvydas, she stated: “Yes, I was studying there and there’s nothing here more to talk about.” Despite Ulvydas’ explanation that his former claim was lapsus linguae on Facebook, this resulted in the launch of an investigation by the Lithuanian Seimas. The former President Grybauskaitė had been accused of providing false information, thus violating her oath of office two times.

Tulip post scandal 
In September 2019, Grybauskaitė found herself at the centre of the so-called “tulip post” corruption scandal, which was one of the greatest blows to her career throughout both terms of presidency. Emails from 2014 to 2016 came to light indicating that the President possibly knew about the unlawful relations between politician Eligijus Masiulis and the business group MG Baltic. In 2016, when looking for a new General Prosecutor, Grybauskaitė via Masiulis wished “best of luck” to the President of the MG Baltic, Darius Mockus, in “taking his hound [LNK journalist Tomas Dapkus] with him”. She had also allegedly pressured Masiulis into following her orders such as convincing the then-ruling Social Democratic Party, to prevent Saulius Skvernelis from getting a post “if he goes to a party that is not aiming for a coalition”. Only Masiulis himself has been accused of bribery, graft as well as mass-scale trading in influence by the court. However, the scandal had significantly affected the President's ratings with the polls indicating a drop of almost 11% of support from the general public. The per cent of people having a negative opinion about Grybauskaitė rose from 18.5% to 27.5%. The Presidential Palace stated that there's no way of proving the authenticity of these emails. “The rule of the democratic system of the oligarchy was stopped even though we all burnt our fingers, including me,” Grybausakitė said in her last but one annual President's Report.

Supporting a pro-war stance of NATO against Russia 
Following the 2022 Russian invasion of Ukraine, ex-President Grybauskaitė publicly supported a direct NATO military confrontation with Russia believing the diplomatic negotiations had failed and more sanctions won’t deter Russia from pursuing its military goals. “War can be only stopped by a war, which has already started,” Grybauskaitė wrote on Facebook. “I’m ashamed to hear that leaders and officials of NATO states are muttering about not being able to involve in the conflict but being fine with it in the case of Syria, Libya, Africa, Yugoslavia, and Afghanistan?” she added. Although the Conservatives supported her message, this rhetoric was met with criticism from some Lithuanian politicians. During an interview, Ramūnas Karbauskis claimed that such rhetoric is harmful to the relations with the West and compared this to Lithuania’s stance against China, which resulted in a costly economic blockade. “We can trash the leaders of France and Germany all we want but afterwards we will be going to have a conversation with them about the need for additional military troops [in the country],” he said. “Grybauskaitė can say whatever she wants as she is a senior citizen and bares no responsibility for her words. [...] If Lithuanian leaders start talking like this, there will surely be irreversible consequences.”

Awards 
Grybauskaitė has received the following national and international awards:

Further reading

 Tomas Janeliūnas. 2020. Foreign Policy Analysis of a Baltic State: Lithuania and 'Grybauskaitė Doctrine'. Routledge.

References

External links

 Website of the Lithuanian President Dalia Grybauskaitė
 Lithuania set for energy rethink -interview with BBC. BBC World News
 Lunch with the FT: Dalia Grybauskaite. Financial Times
 Grybauskaitė run for the President (video)

|-

|-

|-

|-

1956 births
20th-century Lithuanian women politicians
20th-century Lithuanian politicians
Communist Party of the Soviet Union members
Female heads of state
Diplomats from Vilnius
Lithuanian European Commissioners

Living people
Lithuanian female karateka
Ministers of Finance of Lithuania
Politicians from Vilnius
Presidents of Lithuania
Women European Commissioners
21st-century Lithuanian women politicians
21st-century Lithuanian politicians
Women government ministers of Lithuania
Women presidents

Commander's Crosses of the Order of the Lithuanian Grand Duke Gediminas
Grand Crosses with Golden Chain of the Order of Vytautas the Great
Grand Officers of the Order of Saint-Charles
Knights Grand Cross of the Order of the Falcon
Recipients of the Collar of the Order of the Cross of Terra Mariana
Recipients of the Order pro Merito Melitensi
Female finance ministers
Independent politicians in Lithuania
First Class of the Order of the Star of Romania